Mohns is the surname of:

Arthur Mohns (1896-?), German footballer
Doug Mohns (born 1933), Canadian retired National Hockey League player
Greg Mohns (1950-2012), executive and coach in the Canadian Football League
Lloyd Mohns (1921-2005), Canadian who played in one National Hockey League game

See also
Mohn (disambiguation)
Mohns Ridge, a mid-ocean ridge in the Greenland Sea - see Greenland Plain